The National Comics Awards  was a series of awards for comic book titles and creators given out on an annual basis from 1997 to 2003 (with the exception of the year 2000) for comics published in the United Kingdom the previous year. The votes were by the U.K. comics fan community, and were open to anyone.

The Awards were founded in 1997 by comic creators Kev F Sutherland and Mark Buckingham. They took over for the UK Comic Art Awards, which were presented from 1990 to 1997 (which had themselves replaced the Eagle Awards, which were the dominant British comics awards from 1977 to 1990). The National Comics Awards were distinguished by the distinctive "Jimmy" statue designed by Buckingham.

Structure and categories 
The National Comics Awards were awarded by UK comics fans voting for work produced during the previous year. Financial supporters of the awards could have their companies' names added to an individual award, as well as having a representative of the business present the award at the ceremony.

The National Comics Awards were presented to individual creators as well as for publications and characters. There was also a section of the awards devoted to all-time lists. From 1997 to 1999, voters were required to pay to vote for the "Best Comic Ever" category, with all proceeds going to charity: in 1997 the category was "Best British Comic Ever," in 1998 it was "Best Comic in the World Ever," and in 1999 it was "Best Comic of the 20th Century" (with all proceeds going to the ChildLine Charity).

History
The first National Comics Awards presentation took place 15 March 1997 at United Kingdom Comic Art Convention (UKCAC) in London, presented by Jonathan Ross and Paul Gambaccini.

In 1998 the Awards took place at the Manchester UKCAC.

The Awards were held at the Bristol Comic Festival in 1999, and from 2001 to 2003. There were no National Comics Awards presented in 2000, as the Eagle Awards were revived that year.

The 2002 Awards were hosted by Kev F Sutherland. Presenters included Mike Conroy and Dez Skinn of Comics International, Martin Averre of Ace Comics, Dave Finn of Incognito Comics, Mark Buckingham, Nick Parry-Jones of Red Route Distribution, The Comedian from Watchmen and Alice in Wonderland (a.k.a. character costume models Doug Oliver and Andrea Sanders), Dave Gibbons, Karen Berger, Jonathan Bryans and Bryan Liddiard of Naturesguard, Carol Bennett of Knockabout Comics, Rich Johnston, Alex Summersby of MacUnlimited, and Jim Valentino.

The 2003 awards, presented in London at that year's Comic Festival, were sponsored by Red Route Distribution, Ace Comics, Incognito Comics, Tripwire, Knockabout Comics, SFX magazine, Bulletproof Comics, Comics International, Borders Books, and Diamond Previews.

After 2003 the major UK comics awards again became the Eagle Awards, until 2012 (2014) when they were discontinued.

Awards

Individual awards

Best Writer / Best Writer in Comics Today/Now
1997: Garth Ennis
1998: Grant Morrison
1999: John Wagner
2001: John Wagner, for Button Man and Judge Dredd (both in 2000 AD)
2002: Grant Morrison
Alan Moore
Warren Ellis
John Wagner
Brian Michael Bendis
Garth Ennis
Frank Miller
Anonymous (The Beano)
Robbie Morrison
Neil Gaiman
 2003: Dan Abnett 
John Wagner
Grant Morrison
Alan Moore
Brian Michael Bendis
Mark Millar
Garth Ennis
Mike Carey
Gordon Rennie 
Andy Diggle

Best Artist / Best Artist in Comics Today/Now 
1997: Alex Ross
1998: Steve Dillon
1999: Alex Ross
2001: Carlos Ezquerra for Judge Dredd, Strontium Dog (2000 AD), and Just a Pilgrim (Black Bull Comics)
2002: Frank Quitely
Frazer Irving
Bryan Hitch
Carlos Ezquerra
John Cassaday
John Romita, Jr.
Frank Miller
Alan Davis
Steve Dillon
Alex Ross
 2003 (sponsored by Ace Comics): Bryan Hitch
 Henry Flint
 Jock
 Nick Brennan
 Frazer Irving
 Frank Quitely
 Jim Lee
 Karl Richardson
 Steve Dillon
 Carlos Ezquerra

Best New Talent
2001 (tie):
Frazer Irving, for Necronauts in 2000 AD
Jock, for Judge Dredd in 2000 AD
2002: Frazer Irving
John Watson
Mike Carey
Tan Eng Huat
Simon Spurrier
Nick Locking
Ed Brubaker
Geoff Johns
Jock
Judd Winick
 2003 (sponsored by Tripwire): Andy Diggle (writer, Lady Constantine (DC), Snow Tiger (2000 AD))
 Karl Richardson
 Simon Spurrier
 Andy Clarke
 Antony Johnston 
 Frazer Irving
 Brian K. Vaughan 
 Jai Sen
 Dom Reardon 
 Bruce Jones

Publication awards

Best Comic (British)
1997: 2000 AD
1998: 2000 AD
1999: 2000 AD

Best Comic Now 
2002: The Beano
2000 AD
Transmetropolitan
New X-Men
Planetary
Lucifer
Batman: The Dark Knight Strikes Again
100 Bullets
X-Force
Ultimate Spider-Man

Best Comic in the World Today
2001: 2000 AD, edited by Andy Diggle (Rebellion Developments)
2002: The Beano
2000 AD
Watchmen
The Sandman
Preacher
X-Men
Batman: The Dark Knight Returns
Spider-Man
Batman
V for Vendetta
2003 (Comics International Award for Comic of the Year): 2000 AD 
 The Dandy
 Warhammer Monthly
 The Ultimates
 The Beano
 Judge Dredd Megazine 
 The League of Extraordinary Gentlemen
 Fables
 New X-Men
 Daredevil
 100 Bullets
 Batman
 Hellblazer 
 Alias
 Lucifer
 Three Days in Europe
 Y: The Last Man
 The Amazing Spider-Man 
 The Filth
 Ultimate X-Men

Best New Comic
1997: 
 British: Octobriana
 Int'l: Hitman (DC Comics)
1998: 
 British: Gyre
 Int'l: Transmetropolitan (DC)
1999: 
 British: Warhammer (Games Workshop)
Kane
Sleaze Castle
Strangehaven
The Beano
 Int'l: The League of Extraordinary Gentlemen (DC/ABC)
2001: Green Arrow, by Kevin Smith and Phil Hester (DC Comics)
2002: Ultimates
The Establishment
New X-Men
Alias
Doom Patrol
Origin
Batman: The Dark Knight Strikes Again
Batgirl
Catwoman
Muties
 2003: Y: The Last Man (Vertigo Comics)
 Fables
 Jack Staff
 Three Days in Europe
 The Filth
 Lady Constantine
 Courtney Crumrin
 Pop London
 The League of Extraordinary Gentlemen Vol. 2 
 Judge Dredd vs. Aliens

Best Self-Published/Independent
1997: Strangehaven, by Gary Spencer Millidge
1998: Kane, by Paul Grist
1999: Class of '79
2001: Petra Etcetera, by Terry Wiley, Dave McKinnon and Ady Kermode
2002: Zarjaz
Jack Staff
Strangehaven
Cerebus
Bone
Petra Etcetera
Hardly The Hog
Finder
Arsenic Lullaby
Diesel Sweeties
2003 (sponsored by Knockabout Comics): Jack Staff by Paul Grist 
 Zarjaz
 Fred the Clown
 The Girly Comic
 Miranda
 Oddcases
 Strangehaven
 30 Days of Night
 Bone
 Devilchild

Best Comic (International)
1997: Preacher (DC Comics)
1998: Preacher (DC)
1999: Preacher

Best Cover
1997: Kingdom Come #1, by Alex Ross (DC Comics)

Best Individual Story
1997: Kingdom Come #1, by Mark Waid and Alex Ross (DC Comics)

Best Collected Series or Graphic Novel
1999: Superman For All Seasons
2003 (sponsored by Borders Books): Daemonifuge (Kev Walker and Jim Campbell) — Black Library Press
 The League of Extraordinary Gentlemen
 Rosemary's Backpack (Drew Gilbert and Antony Johnston) 
 30 Days of Night (Steve Niles and Ben Templesmith) 
 The Ultimates vol. one
 The Dark Knight Strikes Again 
 Catwoman: Selina's Big Score 
 Fables: Legends In Exile
 The Redeemer (Pat Mills, Debbie Gallagher, Wayne Reynolds) 
 After the Snooter (Eddie Campbell)

Best Newspaper Strip / Best Online Strip 
1997: Calvin & Hobbes
1998: Calvin & Hobbes
1999: Calvin & Hobbes
2002: The Atrocity
Bobbins
Marshal Law
Super Idol
Dilbert
Sluggy Freelance
Nowhere Girl
Bullpen Bits (Marvel)
Squidbitz
Astounding Space Thrills
 2003 (sponsored by Bulletproof Comics): Fred the Clown (Roger Langridge) 
 Oddcases
 Nowhere Girl
 Red Meat
 Bash Street Kids Capers 
 Juniper Crescent 
 PvP
 Astounding Space Thrills
 Death Takes a Holiday
 Miffy (Borderline)

Best Comic-based Multimedia
1997: Spawn figures, produced by Todd Toys

Best Comic-based Film/TV
1997: The Adventures of Lois & Clark
1998: Men in Black
1999: Blade
2001: X-Men, directed by Bryan Singer (20th Century Fox)
2002: Ghost World
X-Men
Smallville
Spider-Man
Blade II
Dennis The Menace
From Hell
Batman (animated)
Justice League (animation)
X-Men: Evolution
 2003 (Sponsored by SFX magazine): Spider-Man 
 Daredevil
 X2
 Smallville
 Road to Perdition
 Blade II
 Justice League 
 American Splendor
 Birds of Prey
 Dan Dare: Pilot of the Future

Best Specialist Comics Publication / Best Specialist Magazine or Website
1997: Comics International
1998: Tripwire
1999: Comics International
2001: Comics International magazine (and website) published by Dez Skinn
2002: Borderline
 2000adonline.com
Comics International
Beanotown
Wizard
Komixworld
Comic Book Resources
Ninth Art
DC Comics.com
Tripwire
 2003 (sponsored by Diamond Previews): Comics International
 2000adonline.com 
 Borderline 
 Ninth Art
 Tripwire
 Black Library
 Beanotown
 Newsarama
 Silver Bullet Comics
 Sequential Tart

Character awards

Best Character
1997: Batman (DC Comics)
1998: Batman (DC)
1999 (tie):
Batman
Judge Dredd
2001: Judge Dredd, Created by John Wagner & Carlos Ezquerra, published in 2000 AD
2002: Judge Dredd (2000 AD)
Dennis the Menace
Batman
Spider-Man
Spider Jerusalem (Transmetropolitan)
Nikolai Dante
Roger The Dodger
John Constantine (Hellblazer)
Daredevil
Superman
 2003: Judge Dredd
 Blinky (The Dandy) 
 John Constantine
 Batman
 Kal Jerico
 Nikolai Dante
 Spider-Man
 Wolverine
 Desperate Dan
 Sláine

Best Supporting Character
1997: Cassidy (Preacher)
1998: Cassidy (Preacher)
1999: Judge Galen DeMarco
2001: Natt The Hat, from Hitman comic by John McCrea and Garth Ennis
2002: Gnasher
Wulf Sternhammer
Barbara Gordon/Oracle (Birds of Prey, Batman)
Alfred (Batman)
Cassidy (Preacher)
Lex Luthor (Superman, Batman)
Nightwing (Nightwing, Batman)
Sinister Dexter
Deena Pilgrim (Powers)
Doop (X-Force)
 2003: Big Yellow Dog (from Blinky, in The Dandy, by Nick Brennan) 
 Gnasher
 Ukko the Dwarf
 Wulf Sternhammer
 Scabbs (Kal Jerico) 
 Judge Hershey
 Chesters Aliens
 Jekyll/Hyde (The League of Extraordinary Gentlemen) 
 Joe Pineapples 
 Beryl the Peril's Dad

Most Missed Character, Strip, or Comic
1997: Dan Dare
1998: Dan Dare
1999: Johnny Alpha (Strontium Dog)

All-time awards

Best Comics Writer Ever
2001: Alan Moore, for Watchmen, Swamp Thing (DC Comics), V for Vendetta, Miracleman (Quality Communications), Halo Jones (2000 AD)
2002: Alan Moore
John Wagner
Stan Lee
Neil Gaiman
Grant Morrison
Frank Miller
Alan Grant
Pat Mills
Anonymous (The Beano)
Garth Ennis
 2003 (sponsored by Red Route Distribution): Alan Moore 
John Wagner
Grant Morrison
Stan Lee
Dan Abnett 
Neil Gaiman
Alan Grant
Frank Miller 
Gordon Rennie
Pat Mills

Best Comics Artist Ever
2001: Carlos Ezquerra, for Judge Dredd
2002: Jack Kirby
Brian Bolland
Carlos Ezquerra
Mike McMahon
Alex Ross
Neal Adams
Alan Davis
Frank Miller
Simon Bisley
Will Eisner
 2003 (sponsored by Incognito Comics): Jack Kirby 
 Carlos Ezquerra 
 Brian Bolland
 Dave Gibbons
 Colin MacNeil
 Will Eisner
 Mike McMahon
 Simon Bisley
 Bryan Talbot
 John Buscema

Best British Comic Ever
1997: The Beano
The Eagle
Viz Comic
2000 AD

Best Comic in the World Ever
1998: The Eagle

Best Comic of the 20th Century
1999: The Eagle

Roll of Honor/Lifetime Achievement
1997: Dez Skinn
1998: Archie Goodwin
1999: Bob Kane
2002: Alan Moore
John Wagner
The Beano
Stan Lee
Frank Miller
Phil Hall
Mike McMahon
Pat Mills
Alan Grant
Will Eisner
2003: John Wagner
 Stan Lee
 Alan Moore 
 Will Eisner
 Pat Mills
 Rich Johnston
 Carlos Ezquerra 
 Frank Miller
 John Buscema
 Alan Grant

See also
Eagle Award
Ally Sloper Award

References

Comics awards